Regional School Unit 57 (RSU 57), formerly known as Maine School Administrative District 57 (MSAD 57), is a school district in Maine. The district office is located in Waterboro, Maine, next to Massabesic High School. Its current superintendent is Larry Malone.

Schools 
RSU 57 is in charge of the seven schools in the district, its buses, and the athletic fields:

Programs 
RSU 57 offers a selection of programs for students as well as adults, such as:

Massabesic Adult and Community Education (M.A.C.E.)
Summer School Programs
Community Events
Holiday Fairs
Sports activities

Media
RSU 57 programs a local educational access channel, Massabesic TV, which is seen on Time Warner Cable channel 16 and MetroCast channel 2 within the district area.

Spending 
 In a certain fiscal year, RSU 57 ranked 26th of 30 school districts in per-pupil spending.

See also
List of school districts in Maine

References

External links
RSU 57 official website

57
Education in York County, Maine